Warren County Community College (WCCC) is a public community college in Warren County, New Jersey. Its campus is in Washington Township.

History
Warren County Community College was established in 1981. Its first class of students graduated in 1988. Four years later, the college was accredited by the Middle States Association of Colleges and Schools.

Academics
Warren County Community College offers degree programs and certificate programs. The college serves approximately 1,800 full-time and part-time students, in addition to students in non-credit programs and courses.  Dr. William Austin has served as the college president since 2003.

External links

Two-year colleges in the United States
New Jersey County Colleges
Universities and colleges in Warren County, New Jersey
Educational institutions established in 1981
1981 establishments in New Jersey
Washington Township, Warren County, New Jersey